The first series of The Emily Atack Show, is a British comedy television series, which began airing on 4 November 2020 and concluded after six episodes on 9 December 2020. The show follows Emily Atack's performances at the Clapham Grand along with sketches and impressions.

Cast
All cast members are played by themselves.

 Emily Atack
 Ambreen Razia
 Barney Fishwick
 Bryony Twydle
 Cam Spence
 Cole Anderson-James
 Harry Kershaw
 Holli Dempsey
 James McNicholas
 Jarreau Antoine
 Rebecca Rogers
 Rich Keeble
 Shiloh Coke
 Zadeiah Campbell-Davies

Episodes

References

2020 British television seasons